Oussama Litim (born 3 June 1990) is an Algerian professional footballer who plays as a goalkeeper for MC Alger.

Career

Club career
Oussama Litim start his career with NRB Bouhmama. After moving to MSP Batna, USM Blida and DRB Tadjenanet, he signed with MC Oran on 2018.

On 3 September 2021, Litim joined Saudi Arabian club Al-Ain. After less than a month, he left the saudi team.

International career
Litim was called up to represent the senior Algeria A' national football team for a friendly game on 17 June 2021 against Libera.

Honours

Clubs
MSP Batna
Algerian Ligue Professionnelle 2 (1): 2014–15

References

External links
 

1990 births
Living people
People from Khenchela Province
Algerian footballers
Algeria international footballers
Algerian expatriate footballers
MSP Batna players
USM Blida players
DRB Tadjenanet players
MC Oran players
Al-Ain FC (Saudi Arabia) players
Algerian Ligue Professionnelle 1 players
Algerian Ligue 2 players
Association football goalkeepers
Expatriate footballers in Saudi Arabia
Algerian expatriate sportspeople in Saudi Arabia
21st-century Algerian people